The list of ship launches in 1856 includes a chronological list of some ships launched in 1856.


References

Sources

1856
Ship launches